80 (eighty) is the natural number following 79 and preceding 81.

In mathematics 
80 is:

 the sum of Euler's totient function φ(x) over the first sixteen integers.
 a semiperfect number, since adding up some subsets of its divisors (e.g., 1, 4, 5, 10, 20 and 40) gives 80.
 a ménage number.
 palindromic in bases 3 (22223), 6 (2126), 9 (889), 15 (5515), 19 (4419) and 39 (2239).
 a repdigit in bases 3, 9, 15, 19 and 39.

The Pareto principle (also known as the 80-20 rule) states that, for many events, roughly 80% of the effects come from 20% of the causes.

Every solvable configuration of the 15 puzzle can be solved in no more than 80 single-tile moves.

In science 

 The atomic number of mercury

In religion 

 According to Exodus 7:7, Moses was 80 years old when he initially spoke to Pharaoh on behalf of his people. Today, 80 years of age is the upper age limit for cardinals to vote in papal elections.

In other fields 

Eighty is also:
 used in the classic book title Around the World in Eighty Days
 the length of the Eighty Years' War or Dutch revolt (1568–1648)
 the standard TCP/IP port number for HTTP connections
 the 80A, 80B and 80C photographic filters correct for excessive redness under tungsten lighting
 The year  AD 80, 80 BC, or 1980
 Eighty shilling ale
 The older four-pin-base version of the 5Y3GT rectifier tube
 A common limit for the characters per line, in computing, derived from the number of columns in IBM cards
 American band Green Day has a song called "80"
 A fictional alien superhero named Ultraman 80
 On the Réaumur scale, 80 degrees is the boiling temperature of pure water at sea level

See also
 List of highways numbered 80

References

External links 

 wiktionary:eighty for 80 in other languages.

Integers